The Danata Formation (or Danatinskaya, Danatinsk, Russian: Danata Svita) is an Upper Paleocene to Middle Eocene sedimentary succession located in Turkmenistan. It is mostly famous for its fish-bearing horizons (Ichthyofauna).
The formation for example crops out in the Kopet Dag mountain range in the border region of Turkmenistan and Iran.

Fossil content 
The Danata Formation is famous for its ichthyofauna. This includes fossils of the family Turkmenidae. Luvarus necopinatus was first described in this formation. Other fossils of fish include the genera Eospinus, Danatinia, Exellia, Turkmene and Avitoluvarus. The snake species Archaeophis turkmenicus has also been described.

A similar fauna occurs in the Moler Formation in Denmark.

References

Bibliography 
 

Geologic formations of Turkmenistan
Paleogene System of Asia
Thanetian Stage
Ypresian Stage
Lutetian Stage
Shale formations
Sandstone formations
Paleontology in Turkmenistan